Poecilotettix is a genus of spur-throated grasshoppers in the family Acrididae and the tribe Dactylotini. There two known described species in Poecilotettix.

Species
These two species belong to the genus Poecilotettix:
 Poecilotettix pantherinus (Walker, F., 1870) c g b (panther-spotted grasshopper)
 Poecilotettix sanguineus Scudder, 1897 i c g b (red-lined grasshopper)
Data sources: i = ITIS, c = Catalogue of Life, g = GBIF, b = Bugguide.net

References

Further reading

 
 

Melanoplinae
Articles created by Qbugbot
Orthoptera of North America